Pierre School District #32-2 is a school district headquartered in Pierre, South Dakota.

The district serves Pierre and Oahe Acres.

History
In 2020 the district passed a 4% pay raise for teachers.

In 2021 the district hired 29 new teachers, with 24 of them filling in for teachers who had left.

Schools
 Secondary
 T. F. Riggs High School
 Georgia Morse Middle School
 Elementary
 Buchanan
 Jefferson
 Kennedy

References

External links
 Pierre School District
School districts in South Dakota
Pierre, South Dakota
Education in Hughes County, South Dakota